Noémi Szécsi (born 1976) is a Hungarian writer and translator. She was educated in Budapest and Helsinki. Her debut novel The Finno-Ugrian Vampire was published in 2002, and later translated into English. Her historical novel Communist Monte Cristo (2006) won the EU Prize for Literature.

References

1976 births
Hungarian women novelists
Living people
Historical novelists
Hungarian translators
21st-century Hungarian women writers
Women historical novelists
21st-century Hungarian novelists
21st-century translators